The SS Admiral Sampson was a U.S.-flagged cargo and passenger steamship that served three owners between 1898 and 1914, when it was rammed by a Canadian passenger liner and sank in Puget Sound. Following its sinking off Point No Point, the Admiral Sampson has become a notable scuba diving destination for advanced recreational divers certified to use rebreathing equipment.

The Admiral Sampson was one of several Admiral-class steamships built by William Cramp & Sons Shipbuilding Company in Philadelphia, Pennsylvania for the American Mail Steamship Company. Named in honor of U.S. Navy Admiral William T. Sampson, the other ships in the class were the Admiral Dewey, Admiral Schley, and Admiral Farragut. The Admiral Sampson was a steel-hulled, twin-propeller design with two upper decks constructed of wood, and a single smokestack.

Ordered by the American Mail Steamship Company, it was put in the service of the United Fruit Company and made regular trips between Philadelphia and Caribbean Sea ports.  In February 1900, it came to the rescue of the U.S. Army transport ship McPherson, which was disabled by a broken propeller shaft off Hampton Roads, Virginia. On 4 November 1902 she sank the cargo schooner   in a collision in Massachusetts Bay in dense fog. Bucki's Captain and three crewmen were killed.

In 1909, the Alaska Pacific Steamship Company acquired the Admiral Sampson and its sister ship, the Admiral Farragut, as a result of its growing business on the West Coast shipping routes. Both ships were placed on the San Francisco-Puget Sound shipping route. In 1912, the Alaska Pacific Steamship Company acquired the remaining Admiral-class steamships and merged with the Alaska Coast Company to form the Pacific-Alaska Navigation Company. The new company offered freight and passenger service between San Francisco and Puget Sound and Alaska ports as far north as Nome.

Collision and sinking 
On the morning of August 26, 1914, the Admiral Sampson left Seattle en route to Juneau, Alaska with 126 passengers and crew aboard. Visibility was poor because of fog; the ship's captain, Zimro Moore, ordered a slow crawl of 3 knots, extra lookouts and the ship's whistle sounded at regular intervals. At the same time, the steamship Princess Victoria was inbound to Seattle with similar precautions in place.

Despite both ships' precautions, the Princess Victoria rammed the Admiral Sampson at approximately 5:46 a.m. near Point No Point, 18 miles north of Seattle. The Princess Victoria struck the Admiral Sampson broadside, near the Admiral Sampsons after hatch, a spot about midway between amidships and the ship's stern. Capt. P.J. Hickey of the Princess Victoria kept his ship's engines ahead and pushed the Princess Victoria into the gash torn into the hull of the Admiral Sampson. This action both reduced the amount of water rushing into the hole and allowed some of the Admiral Sampsons passengers and crew to evacuate onto the Princess Victoria.

Princess Victorias crew lowered their ship's lifeboats to aid the Admiral Sampsons passengers and crew, as it was apparent that the latter ship was sinking. Capt. Moore ordered the same action aboard the Admiral Sampson, but only two boats could be lowered in time. Moore ordered that his passengers be dropped overboard for pickup by the lifeboats. He ordered the crew off the ship and said he would stay with the ship.

In addition to tearing a gash that stretched below the Admiral Sampsons waterline, the impact of the Princess Victoria ruptured an oil tank aboard the Admiral Sampson and started a fire. The Princess Victoria was forced to pull away and the Admiral Sampson sank, about 15 minutes after the collision. All told, 114 passengers and crew members were saved. Eight crew members, including Capt. Moore, and three passengers drowned. One injured crew member died later in a hospital.

Casualties 
The wireless operators of both ships transmitted SOS signals constantly. Aboard the Admiral Sampson, wireless operator Walter E. Reker transmitted emergency messages and helped passengers board lifeboats; he then joined his captain on the bridge. Reker and Capt. Moore went down with the ship.

Reker's name was added to the Wireless Operators Memorial in New York City's Battery Park. His name is near that of Jack Phillips, who died from exposure after the sinking of the RMS Titanic.

The Wireless World reported in April 1915: “As the cargo of his vessel consisted of oil, the horrors of fire were super-added to the situation and Reker found too much work to do to think of his own safety. He shared the fate of the captain side by side with him on the bridge.”

Telegraph and Telephone Age reported on May 16, 1915: “It is proof of the bravery and efficiency of the crew that [most] passengers were saved. Reker might have saved himself by taking to the boats with the passengers and the greater part of the crew. He remained at the wireless telegraph key, however, giving direction to the rescuing ship which proved invaluable. He ignored repeated appeals from the boats to save himself. When the last boat had left safely, Reker reported to the bridge and remained to share the fate of the captain. It proved to be too late for them to leave and eight of the men, including the wireless telegraph operator, went down with the ship.”

A large crowd met the Princess Victoria when it reached the Canadian Pacific Railroad wharf shortly after 10 a.m. The Princess Victoria had a gash two or three feet above the waterline, extending  back from the bow.

“Her decks were crowded with people, half of them well-dressed and the other half with only fragments of clothing protecting them from the cold,” the Seattle Star reported. “A gaping wound loomed large in the vessel’s bow, only two or three feet above the water line … In the breech hung a battered hatch cover from the Admiral Sampson.”

A roll call revealed the names of those killed.

 Passenger Ruby Whitson Banbury, who had married the previous October.
 Passenger George Bryant, a printer headed to Alaska to seek employment.
 Passenger John McLaughlin, who was last seen clinging to the ship's rigging as the Admiral Sampson sank.
 Ship's cook L. Cabanas, who was raising four young children on his own after his wife's death two years earlier.
 Scottish-born stewardess Mary Campbell, who was on her first voyage on the Admiral Sampson.
 Quartermaster C.M. Marquist.
 Captain Zimro S. Moore.
 Chief engineer Allen J. Noon, who reportedly drowned while trying to save Mrs. Banbury.
 Wireless telegraph operator Walter E. Reker.
 Watchman A. Sater.
 Messboy John G. Williams.
 Ezra Byrne died later at Providence Hospital of burns.

Salvage 
The wreck of the Admiral Sampson remained undisturbed for 80 years, owing to its depth and the difficulty of a salvage operation. In 1991, Gary Severson and Kent Barnard used side-scan sonar to locate the Admiral Sampsons resting place. The following year, the two men obtained exclusive salvage rights for the ship. They began diving on the wreck with a small, two-man submarine and retrieved artifacts, including the ship's whistle.

The wreck rests about 320 feet below the surface of Puget Sound, directly under a major shipping route. The hull lies in two pieces, having broken apart either as it sank or shortly after it hit bottom. In 1994, the two men expressed hopes that they might find the ship's safe, which was believed to contain a valuable diamond necklace. Another potential prize was a suitcase containing gold brought aboard by a passenger. The search failed to discover the safe, but the salvagers did recover the ship's engine order telegraph and various galley equipment.

Since the pioneering dives in the early 1990s, the Admiral Sampson has become a destination for a handful of technically advanced and experienced divers. Owing to its depth and location, it is believed that fewer than 15 divers visited the Admiral Sampson before 2005. Diving the Admiral Sampson remains a highly technical and involved experience. Owing to its location in Puget Sound shipping lanes, coordination with the U.S. Coast Guard is required.

References
Annual List of Merchant Vessels of the United States, Volume 44 Part 1912. U.S. Government Printing Office, 1912. p. 47
Point No Point, Richard Walker (Arcadia Publishing, 2019), pp. 67–82

Notes

Ocean liners
Steamships of the United States
Ships built by William Cramp & Sons
1898 ships
Wreck diving sites
Shipwrecks of the Washington coast
Maritime incidents in August 1914
Ships sunk in collisions
Underwater diving sites in the United States